Villeneuve is a hamlet in central Alberta, Canada within Sturgeon County. It is home to the band government of the Michel First Nations.

Demographics 

Transportation 
Edmonton/Villeneuve Airport serves the community.

See also 
List of communities in Alberta
List of designated places in Alberta
List of hamlets in Alberta

References 

Hamlets in Alberta
Designated places in Alberta
Sturgeon County